Ogrodzisko may refer to the following places in Poland:
Ogrodzisko, Lower Silesian Voivodeship (south-west Poland)
Ogrodzisko, Łódź Voivodeship (central Poland)